Wogamusin is a Papuan language found in four villages in the Ambunti District of East Sepik Province, Papua New Guinea. It was spoken by about 700 people in 1998.

Phonology

Word-finally, voiceless stops are usually unreleased.

Phonotactics
The consonant  only occurs finally. Bilabial and velar consonants may be followed by  when initial, but otherwise consonant clusters only occur over syllable boundaries, with the exception of the unusual word  ('snake').

Pronouns
Wogamusin pronouns:

{| 
!  !! sg !! du !! pl
|-
! 1
| nay || nond || non
|-
! 2
| ni || noh || nom
|-
! 3m
| ye || yoh || yor
|-
! 3f
| yo ||  || 
|}

External links 
 Paradisec has an open access collection from Theodore Schwartz that includes Wogamusin language materials

Notes

References

Wogamus languages
Languages of East Sepik Province